Over 7,500 cultivars of the culinary or eating apple (Malus domestica) are known. Some are extremely important economically as commercial products, though the vast majority are not suitable for mass production. In the following list, use for "eating" means that the fruit is consumed raw, rather than cooked. Cultivars used primarily for making cider are indicated. Those varieties marked  have gained the Royal Horticultural Society's Award of Garden Merit.

This list does not include the species and varieties of apples collectively known as crab apples, which are grown primarily for ornamental purposes, though they may be used to make jelly or compote. These are described under Malus.

Table of apples

A

B

C

D

E

F

G

H

I

J

K

L

M

N

O

P

Q

R

S

T

U

V

W

Y

Z

Cider apples 
Cider apples are a variety of apples that may be far too sour or bitter for fresh eating, but are used for making cider. Varieties in italics are used for both cider and eating purposes. shp = sharp, swt = sweet, bswt = bittersweet, bshp = bittersharp, c= Ontario Canada, e= Somerset England, f= France, g= Germany, w= Washington US,   s = susceptible, r = resistant, AS =to apple scab,  AC =  apple canker, BI =  bacterial infections, PM =  powdery mildew, TRI = Triploid

Rootstock cultivars
Selection of rootstock cultivars can be difficult: vigorous roots tend to give trees that are healthy but grow too tall to be harvested easily without careful pruning, while dwarfing rootstocks result in small trees that are easy to harvest from, but are often shorter-lived and sometimes less healthy. Most modern commercial orchards use one of the "Malling series" (aka 'M' series), introduced or developed by the East Malling Research Station from the early 20th century onward. However, a great deal of work has been done recently introducing new rootstocks in Poland, the U.S. (Geneva), and other nations. The Polish rootstocks are often used where cold hardiness is needed. The Geneva series of rootstocks has been developed to resist important diseases such as fireblight and collar rot, as well as for high fruit productivity.

See also

 Cooking apple
 Lists of cultivars
 List of apple dishes
 List of Japanese apple cultivars
 Welsh Apples

References

Khanizadeh, S. and J. Cousineau. 1998. "Our Apples/ Les Pommiers de Chez Nous", A Description of Over 250 Apple Cultivars Grown in Eastern and Central Canada Including 400 Coloured Photographs of the Fruits, Flowers and Leaves. Publisher Shahrokh Khanizadeh, 260 p. Ed: S. Khanizadeh. .

Further reading
Two of the most comprehensive publications on apple cultivars are:
Khanizadeh, S. and J. Cousineau. 1998. "Our Apples/ Les Pommiers de Chez Nous", A Description of Over 250 Apple Cultivars Grown in Eastern and Central Canada Including 400 Coloured Photographs of the Fruits, Flowers and Leaves. Publisher Shahrokh Khanizadeh, 260 p. Ed: S. Khanizadeh. .
 The New Book of Apples by Dr Joan Morgan of The National Fruit Collection and Alison Richards.
 Directory of Apple Cultivars by Martin Crawford of The Agroforestry Research Trust
 For Cider apples - "Cider Apples, The New Pomona"  by Liz Copas
 Apples by Roger Yepsen. Text of apple history and descriptions with full-color watercolor illustrations of 90 apple varieties by Yepsen. W.W. Norton and Company, New York and London.
 "Old Southern Apples" by Creighton Lee Calhoun, Jr.

Lists of foods
Lists of cultivars